Robert Louis Mungle (born October 19, 1967) is an American voice actor for Funimation, ADV Films, Seraphim Digital/Sentai Filmworks, and OkraTron 5000. He is also a stand-up comedian, having been known as The Reverend.

Filmography

Anime
 009-1 - Odin
 Akame ga Kill! - Headhunter Zanku, Trauma (Ep. 11)
 Angel Beats! - Matsushita the 5th
 Aquarian Age: Sign for Evolution - Naoyuki Kamikurata
 Area 88 - Greg Gates
 Blue Drop - Gen (Mari's Gardener)
 Blue Seed - Daitetsu Kunikida
 The Book of Bantorra - Vizak, Wyzaf
 Broken Blade - General Baldr
 Bubblegum Crisis Tokyo 2040 - Nick Roland
 Canaan - Jin
 Clannad - Gentleman, Oogami
 Cromartie High School - Pootan's Buddy
 Demon King Daimao - Academy Director, Yatagasru (Crow)
 Devil May Cry: The Animated Series - Morrison
 Devil Survivor 2: The Animation - Berzerker
 Dream Eater Merry - Griccho
 E's Otherwise - Naozumi
 Excel Saga - Pedro
 Fullmetal Alchemist: Brotherhood - Henry Douglas
 Gantz - Hatanaka
 Ghost Hound - Seiichi Suzuki
 Ghost Stories - Amanojaku
 Godannar - Shibakusa
 Golgo 13 - Regan
 The Guin Saga - Archduke Vlad
 Gunsmith Cats - Bill Collins
 Guy: Double Target - Guy
 Guyver: The Bioboosted Armor - Somlum
 Halo Legends - Dutch (The Babysitter), Additional Voices
 Heaven's Memo Pad - Nemo
 Hiiro no Kakera - Drei
 Intrigue in the Bakumatsu - Irohanihoheto - Gensai Hachisuka (Ep. 5–6), Takamori Saigo
 Inu x Boku SS - Joe
 Kamisama Dolls - Yasuyuki Kuga
 Kekko Kamen - Big Toenail of Satan
 Kenichi: The Mightiest Disciple - Sogetsu Ma
 Kiba - Dumas, Hyrum
 La storia della Arcana Famiglia - Mondo
 Le Chevalier D'Eon - Caron de Beaumarchais
 Legends of the Dark King: A Fist of the North Star Story - Uighur
 Log Horizon - Demiquas
 Maburaho - Mr. Miura
 Magikano - Cait Sith
 Majestic Prince - Hideyuki
 Majikoi! - Oh! Samurai Girls - Bandages, Memu
 Mardock Scramble: The First Compression - Flesh the Pike
 Martian Successor Nadesico - Goat Hory
 Moeyo Ken - Kan Kan
 Moonlight Mile - Alan, President Jim McDowell
 Needless - Momiji Teruyama
 Noir - Foster
 One Piece - Igarappoi "Igaram", Tom (Funimation dub)
 Pani Poni Dash! - The Alien Subordinates
 Papuwa - Rod
 Parasyte - Kazuyuki Izumi
 Peacemaker Kurogane - Hajime Saitou
 Princess Resurrection - Poseidon
 Red Garden - Raúl Girardot
 Saint Seiya - Bear Geki, Cancer DeathMask, Additional voices 
 Shirobako - Tatsuya Ochiai
 Sorcerer Hunters OVA - Narrator
 Space Pirate Captain Harlock - Yulian
 Spice and Wolf II - Eligin
 Super Milk Chan - The Landlord, Himself (Live-Action Footage)
 Street Fighter II V - Guile (ADV Dub)
 Tactics - Wantanbe
 Tears to Tiara - Delator
 Tokyo Majin - Big Mama, Yoriki Taisen
 The Ambition of Oda Nobuna - Sakuma Nobumori, Shoukakuin Gousei
 The Wallflower - Sunako's Dad
 Un-Go - Komamori Sasa (Ep. 4), Masahiko Kanda (Ep. 1)
 Utawarerumono - Emuro
 Vinland Saga - Ragnar
 Xam'd Lost Memories - Ahm
 Yugo the Negotiator - Rashid

Video Games
Unlimited Saga - Basil Galeos, Edel

References

External links

1967 births
Living people
American stand-up comedians
American male voice actors
Male actors from Houston
21st-century American comedians